Karim Khouda (born 11 July 1971) is a French-born Algerian football manager.

References

1971 births
Living people
French football managers
Algerian football managers
JS Saoura managers
CS Constantine managers
JSM Béjaïa managers
Algerian Ligue Professionnelle 1 managers
21st-century Algerian people